Bowdle ( is a city in Edmunds County, South Dakota, United States. The population was 470 at the 2020 census.

History
Bowdle was platted in 1886.

Geography
Bowdle is located at  (45.451658, -99.657759).

Bowdle has been assigned the ZIP code 57428, and the FIPS place code 06540.

Demographics

2010 census
As of the census of 2010, there were 502 people, 225 households, and 128 families residing in the city. The racial makeup of the city was 96.0% White, 0.4% Native American, 0.2% Asian, 3.2% from other races, and 0.2% from two or more races. Hispanic or Latino of any race were 5.4% of the population.

There were 225 households, of which 26.7% had children under the age of 18 living with them, 49.3% were married couples living together, 4.9% had a female householder with no husband present, 2.7% had a male householder with no wife present, and 43.1% were non-families. 39.1% of all households were made up of individuals, and 24% had someone living alone who was 65 years of age or older. The average household size was 2.23 and the average family size was 3.02.

The median age in the city was 45.3 years. 24.3% of residents were under the age of 18; 7.5% were between the ages of 18 and 24; 18.2% were from 25 to 44; 24% were from 45 to 64; and 26.3% were 65 years of age or older. The gender makeup of the city was 49.6% male and 50.4% female.

2000 census
As of the census of 2000, there were 571 people, 244 households, and 148 families residing in the city. The population density was 900.1 people per square mile (349.9/km2). There were 283 housing units at an average density of 446.1 per square mile (173.4/km2). The racial makeup of the city was 99.30% White, 0.18% African American, 0.18% Native American, 0.18% Asian, and 0.18% from two or more races.

There were 244 households, out of which 23.8% had children under the age of 18 living with them, 54.1% were married couples living together, 5.3% had a female householder with no husband present, and 39.3% were non-families. 37.7% of all households were made up of individuals, and 25.0% had someone living alone who was 65 years of age or older. The average household size was 2.19 and the average family size was 2.93.

In the city, the population was spread out, with 22.2% under the age of 18, 5.3% from 18 to 24, 19.1% from 25 to 44, 17.9% from 45 to 64, and 35.6% who were 65 years of age or older. The median age was 47 years. For every 100 females, there were 86.0 males. For every 100 females age 18 and over, there were 85.0 males.

The median income for a household in the city was $25,417, and the median income for a family was $34,091. Males had a median income of $23,750 versus $17,500 for females. The per capita income for the city was $14,756. About 12.3% of families and 16.3% of the population were below the poverty line, including 23.9% of those under age 18 and 16.5% of those age 65 or over.

Transportation
Bowdle is served by two major highways:
  (U.S. Route 12)
  (South Dakota Highway 47)

See also
 List of cities in South Dakota
 Bowdle tornado

References

External links

 

Cities in South Dakota
Cities in Edmunds County, South Dakota
Aberdeen, South Dakota micropolitan area